John Patrick Grayken (born June 1956) is an American-born Irish billionaire financier, the founder and chairman of the private equity firm Lone Star Funds.

According to the Bloomberg Billionaires Index in 2021, Grayken is worth $8.7 billion, an increase of $592 million from 2020.

Early life
John Patrick Grayken was born in June 1956, and was brought up in Cohasset, Massachusetts, a suburb of Boston. He received a BA degree in economics from the University of Pennsylvania, and an MBA from the Harvard Business School in 1982.

Career
Grayken first worked at Morgan Stanley, before joining the Texas billionaire Robert Bass.

Grayken founded Lone Star in 1995.

In 1999, Grayken became an Irish citizen, "for tax purposes", renouncing his American citizenship.

Philanthropy
In March 2017, Eilene and John Grayken gave a $25 million gift to the Boston Medical Center (BMC) to create the BMC Grayken Center for Addiction Medicine. The gift is the largest donation in BMC's history. While the couple usually makes their donations anonymously, they explained that they were going public this time to de-stigmatize addiction and to encourage others to do so as well.

In April 2017, John P. Grayken gave a leadership gift to the Wharton School of the University of Pennsylvania to fund the Grayken Program in International Real Estate at the Wharton School.

In February 2019, Grayken and his wife made a $10 million gift to create the Grayken Center for Treatment at South Shore Health, a non-profit, charitable health system in southeastern Massachusetts offering outpatient treatment for substance use disorders. The Center also serves pregnant and post-partum women facing behavioral health and substance use disorders. In October of that year, Grayken matched donations to the Hart Speech Foundation for the treatment of stutters and other speech impediments.

Grayken and his wife made a 2022 donation of £50 million to the Great Ormond Street Hospital, earmarking the funds to find new and better ways to treat childhood illnesses.

Personal life
Grayken divorced his first wife soon after he became a "tax refugee"; they reunited within a month of the final divorce decree, but divorced again six months later. Grayken later married actress Eilene Davidson in London, a British theatre producer and former actress. They have four children.

As of 2015, they owned Pyrford Court, Surrey, which features prominently in the 1976 movie, The Omen. Pyrford Court is a Grade II listed 15-bedroom house, built in 1910 for Rupert Guinness, 2nd Earl of Iveagh. As of 2017, they live in a $70 million home in Chelsea, London, purchased through a company in Bermuda.

References

External links
Profile at Lone Star Funds

1956 births
Living people
Irish billionaires
Irish financial businesspeople
Irish investors
Naturalised citizens of Ireland
People from Cohasset, Massachusetts
American emigrants to Ireland
University of Pennsylvania alumni
Harvard Business School alumni
Former United States citizens